Endothelial colony forming cells (or ECFCs) are adult endothelial progenitor cells capable of differentiating to regenerate endothelial cell populations. They are residents of adult vasculature and are also thought to migrate to areas of injury as one form of circulating endothelial cell. They are thought to play a critical role in vascular healing after injury as well as developmental angiogenesis.

Characteristics
ECFCs are commercially available and phenotypically identified by the positive markers CD34, CD31, VEGFR2, eNOS, CD105, and vWF. They also must test negative for CD133, CD45, and CD117. ECFCs are named for their ability to form colonies of cells which progress rapidly to capillary-like networks in vitro when cultured in biopolymer matrix, and in vivo.

Proliferative potential
A hierarchy has been demonstrated to exist within ECFC populations with regard to proliferative potential. Certain cells within the heterogeneous group of colony forming cells are demonstrated to reach significantly higher population doublings, and retain high levels of telomerase activity. These have been termed high proliferative potential endothelial colony forming cells, or HPP-ECFCs. In contrast, other cells that fit the phenotypic profile for an ECFC but do not maintain the same level of activity are LPP-ECFCs.

Vascular endothelial stem cells have been defined as rare endothelial colony forming cells with extremely high proliferative potential. They have been identified by marker analysis as lin- (lineage negative) CD31+, CD105+, Sca-1+, CD117 (ckit)+ and thought have the ability to generate functional vasculature from single cells.

Medical use
ECFCs have been shown to decline in number and clonal ability with age or peripheral arterial disease, though are increased with acute myocardial infarction. A low number of ECFCs has been identified as a risk factor for infant diseases such as bronchopulmonary dysplasia. ECFCs can become dysfunctional in gestational diabetes (rescued by Vitamin D administration), smoking (driven by DNA damage), and premature birth (driven by decreased expression of histone deacetylase SIRT1). ECFCs are thus thought to have a large potential in therapies for vasculopathies of various etiologies.

ECFC-like cells have also been generated from pluripotent stem cells, perhaps eliminating the need for direct harvesting of the cells for future use.

See also 
List of human cell types derived from the germ layers

References 

Blood cells